Trittau is an Amt ("collective municipality") in the district of Stormarn, in Schleswig-Holstein, Germany. The seat of the Amt is in Trittau.

Municipalities
The Amt Trittau consists of the following municipalities:

Sister cities
The following cities are twinned with Trittau (Amt):
  Saarijärvi, Central Finland, Finland
  Communauté de communes Sèvre et Loire, Loire-Atlantique, France
  Gmina Wieliszew, Poland
  Totton and Eling, United Kingdom

References

Ämter in Schleswig-Holstein